KRNO (106.9 FM, "Sunny 106.9") is a commercial radio station, licensed to Incline Village, Nevada, and broadcasting to Reno, Carson City, and surrounding areas, including Lake Tahoe. It is owned by the Reno Media Group and airs an adult contemporary radio format.  For much of November and December, it switches to all-Christmas music.

The station's studios are located on Matley Lane in Reno, and its transmitter is located on Slide Mountain.  KRNO has an effective radiated power (ERP) of 35,000 watts.

KRNO also rebroadcasts on FM translators K258BN in Verdi at 99.5 FM to cover northwest Reno and K292EP in Incline Village at 106.3 FM to cover the northern Lake Tahoe area.

History
In August 1975, KRNO signed on the air.  It was originally licensed in Reno, as the FM counterpart to KCBN 1230 AM.  The two stations were owned by B.B.C., Inc.  While the AM station played Top 40 hits, KRNO had an easy listening format.  In the 1980s, it gradually moved to soft adult contemporary music.

KRNO dropped its "Sunny" moniker as its prime positioner on March 24, 2014 to become "106.9 More FM." The rebranding, despite the station's high ratings (the station ranked at #2 12+ among subscribing stations in the Fall 2013 Nielsen Audio ratings report), was meant to reflect the updating of the station's playlist to focus on mostly songs released after 2000, with some 1980s and 90s hits.

On September 8, 2022, KRNO rebranded back to its previous brand as "Sunny 106.9".

Lineup
 Jeff Ryan mornings
 Amy Foxx middays
 Dan Fritz afternoons
 Delilah evenings (syndicated from Premiere Networks)
 Amy Foxx weekends

Translators
KRNO also broadcasts on the following translators:

Previous logos

References

External links
KRNO official website

RNO
Mainstream adult contemporary radio stations in the United States
Radio stations established in 1974
1974 establishments in Nevada